The Sharkfighters is a 1956 American adventure film about U.S. Navy scientists working to invent a shark repellent to protect military personnel down at sea. Directed by Jerry Hopper, it stars Victor Mature, James Olson, and Claude Akins. The fictional storyline is based on the invention of "Shark Chaser", an historical shark repellent developed by researchers during World War II.

Plot
In August 1943, Lt. Commander Ben Staves (Mature), recovering from the sinking of his destroyer in battle and the loss of part of his surviving crew to shark attack, is flown to Project Shark Chaser, a tiny and isolated Naval Research Laboratory post on the Isle of Pines in Cuba. Its rich environment for sharks and indigenous English-speaking population of Caymanero fishermen makes it an ideal testing ground for the development of an effective shark repellent. The small research team has been led during its first ten months of investigation by Lt. Commander Leonard "Len" Evans (Coolidge), an ichthyologist formerly with the Scripps Institution, assisted by a chemist, Ensign "Dunk" Duncan (Olson), and a cameraman, Chief Petty Officer "Gordy" Gordon (Akins).

Ben assures Evans that he is there to help him, not take over the project. When Evans tells him they'll get started "first thing in the morning", Ben counters with "Why not now?". The team heads out into the bay on a small fishing boat crewed by a local Caymanero and his teenage son Carlos (Campos) to test copper acetate as a repellent. Evans advises that the project has already tested over 200 methods, including poisons, repulsive odors, color clouds, and ultrasonics, none of which has a lasting effect in driving away sharks. The test is initially successful until the acetate cloud dissipates after a few minutes.

Duncan approaches Ben and asks for a transfer to sea duty, but relents when Ben asks him to postpone the request, which he would have to disapprove because the young chemist is too valuable to the project. Ben reviews Evans's reports, chafing at the slowness of the numerous trials, but Evans defends his work, saying their best success has been only 80% effective because they don't have human test subjects. Ben suggests that they test other methods simultaneously. Evans resents Ben's emphasis on urgency over carefully drawn scientific conclusions.

When Duncan supports Evans, Ben informs them that they will work seven days a week without their usual weekends off in Havana. Gordy suggests that the officers substitute for him every other weekend on trips to Havana to have the classified color film processed. Ben's wife Martha (Steele) is staying in Havana, and during a night out dancing on their next visit, Evans tells Martha that while he admires Ben's determination, he is worried that Ben never lets down his guard. She replies that he and Ben are a lot alike in their integrity, and that Ben and the scientist make a perfect team to achieve success.

Two weeks into the next series of tests, 72 consecutive positive results convince Ben that they've found the answer. Evans still shows reluctance, suggesting two more weeks of trials are needed, so Ben angrily pulls rank on him and orders the results submitted. Carlos accidentally falls overboard while clowning around on the boat, and swims into the repellent cloud for protection. He panics and stabs a shark that ventures too close, drawing a pack that kills him despite the repellent.

After Carlos' funeral, the demoralized Evans rebels when Ben suggests they try an earlier theory about using octopod ink as a repellent. He admits his resentment of being told by Ben how to do his job, and of not being listened to when he had doubts about the repellent that didn't save Carlos. Ben agrees not to push for results this time, but announces that if the tests are conclusive, he's going to put a man in the water to test it before he sends it up. When tests with an octopus are promising, Duncan creates a repellent combining synthetic ink, copper acetate, and water-soluble wax to keep dissipation from occurring. He volunteers as the human bait but Ben is noncommittal.

Before the tests begin, Evans sets up a viewing of the film of Carlos' death to show that although the acetate dissipated when the pack gathered, the octopus tests showed that group attacks can be deterred. Ben forces Len to commit to a hard number of further tests, which is twice what they have done before. Ben cuts the number in half and when Evans sneers that it "has to be your way", Ben retorts that "it's my neck"—he is the logical candidate for the human test—and accuses Len of trying to stop him by using the film as a scare tactic. Ben visits the embassy in Havana to request the naval attaché (Neise) to assign two expert riflemen to the project.

The suspicious attaché maneuvers Ben into revealing his plan to run a test on himself and advises him to seek Navy approval first, but agrees to send the riflemen after Ben insists that he's only setting up preliminary plans. After more positive results than they've ever achieved before, Ben abruptly orders the final test for the next day. Evans argues but begrudgingly acquiesces, admitting to Duncan that Ben has always been right. The repellent works effectively. As numerous sharks begin circling Ben, a marksman nervously shoots one, causing a feeding frenzy. Ben makes for the boat as Evans frantically showers him with extra repellent, which deters the frenzied sharks from attacking. Back aboard, Ben celebrates their success with a beer.

Cast
 Victor Mature as Lt. Commander Ben Staves
 Karen Steele as Martha Staves
 James Olson as Ensign Harold Duncan
 Philip Coolidge as Lt. Commander Leonard Evans
 Claude Akins as Chief "Gordy" Gordon
 Rafael Campos as Carlos
 George Neise as Commander George Zimmer

Production
Samuel Goldwyn Jr. produced the film for Formosa Productions, who released through United Artists. It was Goldwyn Jr's second film, following Man with the Gun. He announced it in December 1954, based on a script by Art and Jo Napoleon. It was called Sharkfighter.

It was based on actual events involving the creation of the Navy's shark repellent, "Shark Chaser", a cake combining copper acetate to mimic putrefied shark tissue, black dye as a camouflage agent, and a water-soluble wax binder as described in the script, which some sources attribute to efforts of Julia Child while working for the Office of Strategic Services during World War II.

"Shark Chaser" was announced as a successful repellent as early as May 7, 1943. A patent application was made in October 1944 and granted in 1949 to four scientists who also designed the packet, and the product was issued by the Navy until 1973. However its effectiveness is now judged dubious (as is the shark threat inspiring its development) by the Navy's Bureau of Medicine and Surgery. The actual scientific work consisted of observations of shark behavior in 1942 off Mayport, Florida; Woods Hole, Massachusetts; and the harbor of Guayaquil, Ecuador by civilian scientists of the Marine Studios oceanarium.

Lawrence Roman and John Robinson rewrote the screenplay.

Victor Mature signed to play the lead in December 1955. By this stage, Goldwyn Jr had a camera crew shooting shark footage for several months, although filming did not begin on the film proper until March 1956.

Karen Steele and James Olson, who appeared in the cast, were signed to long-term contracts by Goldwyn.

Filming
Mature later admitted he did not enjoy filming the action sequences.

The Sharkfighters was filmed in CinemaScope and Technicolor on location in Cuba with an opening narration by Charles Collingwood and released in November 1956 by United Artists. It was the first major Hollywood movie shot entirely in Cuba. Shooting mostly look place on the Isle of Pines, south of the main island.

Death during production
Special effects artist Russell Shearman died from a shark attack while filming underwater scenes for The Sharkfighters in the Caribbean Sea off Cuba.

Film score
The music for The Sharkfighters was composed by Jerome Moross in what was his last adventure film before becoming notable for scoring Westerns, described as "lively and unique." While it is not known if he traveled to Cuba with the company, the distinctly ethnic themes of the music appear to be inspired by the filming on location, using syncopation and percussion instruments highly suggestive of his orchestral composition Biguine.

Thematically the score is characterized by an ostinato that stresses the second half of the second beat but nothing at all on the third beat. This rhythm is employed throughout the varied scene melodies using maracas, xylophones, guitars, claves, and bongos to produce a Caribbean motif. In the Havana night club scene he integrates a rumba into the score, then soothes it to a soft melody underscoring the dialogue between Martha and Len. Also notable is a "unique cue" to announce the presence of sharks. The score of The Sharkfighters displays the fully developed elements of style now associated with Moross in Westerns such as The Big Country.

Release
Sam Goldwyn Jr later said of the film, "we spent a year and a half doing the big scene and I'm afraid I didn't function so well on the story aspect." He admitted the film "fell flat on its face" commercially.

Adaptations
The film was adapted as the Dell Comics comic book Four Color #762 (Jan. 1957), cover-titled The Sharkfighters. The 34-page story, by an unknown writer, was penciled and inked by John Buscema.

See also
 List of American films of 1956

References

Bibliography

External links
 
 
 
 
 The Sharkfighters at Rotten Tomatoes

1956 films
1950s adventure drama films
CinemaScope films
American adventure drama films
Films about sharks
Films about the United States Navy in World War II
Films adapted into comics
Films directed by Jerry Hopper
Films scored by Jerome Moross
Films set in Cuba
Sea adventure films
United Artists films
1950s English-language films
1950s American films